Philip Kennedy was a Scottish football player, who played for Dumbarton and Bathgate during the 1920s. He also had a season on loan with Bo'ness.

References 

Scottish footballers
Dumbarton F.C. players
Bathgate F.C. players
Scottish Football League players
Year of birth missing
Date of death missing
Association football inside forwards
Bo'ness F.C. players